The ASA Best Book Prize, formerly known as the Herskovits Prize (Melville J. Herskovits Prize), is an annual prize given by the African Studies Association to the best scholarly work (including translations) on Africa published in English in the previous year and distributed in the United States. The prize was named after Melville Herskovits, one of the founders of the ASA. The title of the prize was changed in 2019 in response to efforts to decolonize African studies.

Winners
1965 – Ruth S. Morgenthau for Political Parties in French-Speaking West Africa 
1966 – Leo Kuper for An African Bourgeoisie 
1967 – Jan Vansina for Kingdoms of the Savanna 
1968 – Herbert Weiss for Political Protest in the Congo 
1969 – Paul J. Bohannan, Laura Bohannan for Tiv economy 
1970 – Stanlake Samkange for Origins of Rhodesia 
1971 – René Lemarchand for Rwanda and Burundi  
1972 – Francis Deng for Tradition and Modernization 
1973 – Allen F. Isaacman for Mozambique The Africanization of a European Institution 
1974 – John N. Paden for Religion and Political Culture in Kano 
1975 – Elliott Skinner for African Urban Life 
1975 – Lansine Kaba for Wahhabiyya: Islamic Reform and Politics in French West Africa 
1976 – Ivor Wilks for Asante in the Nineteenth Century: The Structure and Evolution of a Political Order  
1977 – Crawford Young for  Politics Cultural Pluralism 
1978 – William Y. Adams for  Nubia: Corridor to Africa 
1979 – Hoyt Alverson for  Mind in the Heart of Darkness: Value and Self-Identity among the Tswana of Southern Africa 
1980 – Margaret Strobel for Muslim Women in Mombasa, 1890-1975
1980 – Richard B. Lee for The !Kung San
1981 – Gavin Kitching for Class and Economic Change in Kenya: The Making of an African Petite-Bourgeoisie 
1981 – Gwyn Prins for The Hidden Hippopotamus: Reappraisal in African History: The Early Colonial Experience in Western Zambia  
1982 – Frederick Cooper for From Slaves to Squatters: Plantation Labor & Agriculture in Zanzibar & Coastal Kenya, 1890-1925  
1982 – Sylvia Scribner, Michael Cole for The Psychology of Literacy 
1983 – James W Fernandez for Bwiti: An ethnography of the religious imagination in Africa 
1984 – J. D. Y. Peel for Ijeshas and Nigerians: The Incorporation of a Yoruba Kingdom, 1890s-1970s  
1984 – Paulin Hountondji for African Philosophy 
1985 – Claire C. Robertson for Sharing the Same Bowl: A Socioeconomic History of Women and Class in Accra, Ghana 
1986 – Sara Berry for Fathers Work for Their Sons: Accumulation, Mobility, and Class Formation in an Extended Yoruba Community 
1987 – Paul Lubeck for Islam and Urban Labor in Northern Nigeria: The Making of a Muslim Working Class  
1987 – T.O. Beidelman for Moral Imagination in Kaguru Modes of Thought
1988 – John Iliffe for The African Poor: A History  
1989 – Joseph Calder Miller for Way Of Death: Merchant Capitalism And The Angolan Slave Trade, 1730-1830 
1989 – V. Y. Mudimbe for The Invention of Africa: Gnosis, Philosophy and the Order of Knowledge  
1990 – Edwin N. Wilmsen for Land Filled with Flies: A Political Economy of the Kalahari 
1991 – Johannes Fabian for Power and Performance: Ethnographic Explorations Through Proverbial Wisdom and Theater in Shaba, Zaire  
1991 – Luise White for The Comforts of Home: Prostitution in Colonial Nairobi 
1992 – Myron Echenberg for Colonial Conscripts: The Tirailleurs Senegalais in French West Africa, 1857-1960  
1993 – Kwame Anthony Appiah for In My Father's House: Africa in the Philosophy of Culture 
1994 – Keletso E. Atkins for The Moon is Dead! Give Us Our Money!: The Cultural Origins of an African Work Ethic, atal, South Africa, 1843-1900  
1995 – Megan Vaughan, Henrietta L. Moore for Cutting Down Trees: Gender, Nutrition, and Agricultural Change in the Northern Province of Zambia, 1890-1990  
1996 – Jonathon Glassman for Feasts and Riot: Revelry, Rebellion, & Popular Consciousness on the Swahili Coast, 1856-1888  
1997 – Mahmood Mamdani for Citizen and Subject 
1997 – Charles van Onsen for The Seed is Mine
1998 – Susan Mullin Vogel for Baule: African Art, Western Eyes 
1999 – Peter Uvin for Aiding Violence: The Development Enterprise in Rwanda 
2000 – Nancy Rose Hunt for A Colonial Lexicon: Of Birth Ritual, Medicalization, and Mobility in the Congo  
2001 – J. D. Y. Peel for Religious Encounter and the Making of the Yoruba  
2001 – Karin Barber for The Generation of Plays: Yoruba Popular Life in Theater 
2002 – Diana Wylie for Starving on a Full Stomach: Hunger and the Triumph of Cultural Racism in Modern South Africa  
2002 – Judith A. Carney for Black Rice: The African Origins of Rice Cultivation in the Americas 
2003 – Joseph E. Inikori for Africans and the Industrial Revolution in England: A Study in International Trade and Economic Development 
2004 – Allen F. Roberts, Mary Nooter Roberts, Gassia Armenian, Ousmane Gueye for A Saint in the City: Sufi Arts of Urban Senegal 
2005 – Adam Ashforth for Witchcraft, Violence, and Democracy in South Africa 
2005 – Jan Vansina for How Societies Are Born: Governance in West Central Africa Before 1600 
2006 – J. Lorand Matory for Black Atlantic Religion: Tradition, Transnationalism, and Matriarchy in the Afro-Brazilian Candomble 
2007 – Barbara MacGowan Cooper for Evangelical Christians in the Muslim Sahel  
2008 - Linda Heywood and John K. Thornton, Central Africans, Atlantic Creoles, and the Foundation of the Americas, 1585-1660
2008 - Parker Shipton, The Nature of Entrustment: Intimacy, Exchange, and the Sacred in Africa
2009 - Sylvester Ogbechie, Ben Enwonwu: The Making of an African Modernist
2010 - Trevor H.J. Marchand, The Masons of Djenne
2010 - Adeline Masquelier, Women and Islamic Revival in a West African Town
2011 - G. Ugo Nwokeji, The Slave Trade and Culture in the Bight of Biafra: An African Society in the Atlantic World
2011 - Neil Kodesh, Beyond the Royal Gaze: Clanship and Public Healing in Buganda
2012 - Simon Gikandi, Slavery and the Culture of Taste
2013 - Derek Peterson, Ethnic Patriotism and the East African Revival: A History of Dissent, c. 1935-1972
2014 - Carola Lentz, Land, Mobility and Belonging in West Africa
2014 - Allen Isaacman and Barbara Isaacman, Dams, Displacement and the Delusion of Development: Cahora Bassa and its Legacies in Mozambique, 1965-2007
2015 - Abena Dove Osseo-Asare, Bitter Roots: The Search for Healing Plants in Africa
2016 - Chika Okeke-Agulu, Postcolonial Modernism: Art and Decolonization in Twentieth-Century Nigeria
2017 - Fallou Ngom, Muslims beyond the Arab World: The Odyssey of Ajami and the Muridiyya
2018 - Lisa A. Lindsay, Atlantic Bonds: A Nineteenth-Century Odyssey from America to Africa
2019 - Michael A. Gomez, African Dominion: A New History of Empire in Early and Medieval West Africa
2020 - Adom Getachew, Worldmaking after Empire: The Rise and Fall of Self-Determination
2021 - Naminata Diabate, Naked Agency: Genital Cursing and Biopolitics in Africa
2022 - Cajetan Iheka, African Ecomedia: Network Forms, Planetary Politics

External links
 ASA Best Book Prize Winners - African Studies Association

References 

American non-fiction literary awards